A milk substitute is any substance that resembles milk and can be used in the same ways as milk.  Such substances may be variously known as non-dairy beverage, nut milk, grain milk, legume milk, mock milk and alternative milk.

For adults, milk substitutes take two forms: plant milks, which are liquids made from plants and may be home-made or commercially produced, and coffee creamers, synthetic products invented in the US in the 1900s specifically to replace dairy milk in coffee. For infants, breast milk can be substituted with infant formula based on cow's milk or plant based alternatives such as soybean.

History 
Around the world, humans have traditionally consumed plant milks  for hundreds, if not thousands, of years. In 2018, Tara McHugh in Food Technology Magazine wrote: "The word “milk” has been used since around 1200 AD to refer to plant juices." The article also said: "Of all the plant-based milks, coconut milk has the longest tradition of use. It originated in India and Southeast Asia and has been used as both a drink and an ingredient for nutrition and ceremonial offerings. Soy milk also has a long history and was discovered in 1365 in China."

In 2018, Benjamin Kemper wrote in the Smithsonian Magazine: Linguistically speaking, using “milk” to refer to “the white juice of certain plants” (the second definition of milk in the Oxford American Dictionary) has a history that dates back centuries. The Latin root word of lettuce is lact, as in lactate, for its milky juice, which indicates that even the Romans had a fluid definition for milk. Ken Albala, professor of history at University of the Pacific and host of the podcast Food: A Cultural Culinary History, says that almond milk “shows up in pretty much every medieval cookbook.” Almonds, which originate in the Middle East, reached southern Europe with the Moors around the 8th century, and their milk—yes, medieval Europeans called it milk in their various languages and dialects—quickly became all the rage among aristocrats as far afield as Iceland. Plant-based milk substitutes have grown rapidly in popularity since the start of the 21st century, with an expected growth rate of 10.18% from 2020 to 2024. The reasons for this increase in popularity range from a growth in vegan and plant-based diets to perceptions of health benefits of milk substitutes to personal flavor preference. Many milk substitutes now contain additives, such as thickening agents and flavors, to aid in taste and texture compared with dairy milk, as well as nutritional fortification.

Fortification

Humans may consume dairy milk for a variety of reasons, including tradition, availability and nutritional value (especially minerals like calcium, vitamins such as B12, and protein). Plant-sourced substitutes for dairy milk may be expected to meet such standards, though there are no legal requirements for them to do so. This may result in additives being put into milk substitutes to compensate for the absence of certain vitamins, minerals and/or proteins. Infant formula, whether based on cow's milk, soy or rice, is usually fortified with iron and other dietary nutrients.

In comparison with cow's milk, fortified milk substitutes have a comparable amount of calcium, however tend to fall behind in essential vitamin B12 and minerals such as iodine and iron. Legume milks, on average have comparable protein and energy levels to cow's milk, with grain milks, tree nut milks, and seed milks falling behind in this category.

Non-dairy milks

Plant milks are mass-produced fluids made from plant extracts and water. They are made to replace dairy milks as beverages and as cooking ingredients. Plant milks are particularly important to consumers who suffer from cow's milk allergies, lactose intolerances or hypercholesterolemia. Individuals who adhere to dairy-free diet patterns (e.g. Vegan, Paleo, Whole 30) are also important consumers.

Coconut milk is made by mixing water with the freshly grated white inside pulp of a ripe coconut. Though considered by some in the west as a substitute for dairy milk, coconut milk has been used as a traditional ingredient in Southeast Asian, South Asian, Caribbean, and northern South American cuisines for centuries, if not millennia. It is also a source of calcium and vitamins C, E, B1, B3, B5, and B6. Coconut milk is usually very high in fat and calories, but low in protein, which makes it a good substitute for cream, as it can be whipped up in a similar fashion to decorate baked goods or desserts.

Almond milk is produced from almonds by grinding almonds with water, then straining the pulp from the liquid. This procedure can be done at home. Almond milk is low in saturated fat and calories. The market demand for almond milk has grown continuously throughout the 2010s and 2020s; this is accredited to the increasing number of health-conscious consumers coupled with rising inclination to incorporate more plant-based foods into the diet. Macadamia nut milk, cashew milk and hazelnut milk are similar commercially available nut-based beverages, but they are not as popular as coconut milk or almond milk.

Soy milk is made from soybeans and contains about the same amount of protein as dairy milk. When enriched by the manufacturer, it may be a source of calcium and vitamin D and some B vitamins such as B12; however, this is not in all brands of soy milk. According to one study, soy protein may be a substitution for animal protein to prevent and control chronic kidney disease. Peanut milk and Pea milk made from yellow pea protein are two other legume-based beverages that can serve as alternatives to soy milk. Pea milk would be the least allergenic of the three.

Some milk substitutes use cereal grains instead of nuts or legumes. Oat milk is a relatively recently developed plant-based milk substitute. Different preparations are available for either direct consumption or to use in coffee. Oat milk has a smooth oatmeal flavour and is often supplemented with calcium and vitamins to be a viable vegan mammalian milk replacement. Oat milk is marketed as an environment-friendly alternative to almond milk.  Rice milk is mostly used for baking because of its sweet taste, but in case of a nut or soy allergy a grain milk processed from rice may be preferable. When fortified, this milk can be a source of calcium, vitamin B12, and vitamin D2. In spite of its low allergenic potential, it's sometimes medically necessary to limit or avoid rice milk. Due to the levels of inorganic arsenic in rice milk, the UK's Food Standards Agency recommends against feeding it to infants, toddlers and young children.

Popular seed-derived milk substitutes include Hemp milk and Flax milk. They are made by grinding seeds with water, which are then strained to yield a nutty creamy flavored milk. Hemp milk is naturally rich in protein and amino acids. Chia milk and quinoa milk are also commercially available but these are less commonplace as they are considerably newer developments.

In yeast-derived milk products, sugar is mixed with yeast and the resulting fermentation process creates the whey and casein proteins (which are identical to those found in milk). This is then combined with plant-based sugars, fats, and minerals to reproduce the milk, which can then be used like regular milk, including cheesemaking. Milk substitutes produced in this way do not require the use of animals and compared to regular milk production are more efficient, produce fewer greenhouse gases and utilize less land (as no animals need to be fed, medicated, impregnated, milked, and slaughtered when no longer productive).

Lactose intolerance

Lactose is the major sugar found in dairy milk. Lactose intolerance occurs when an individual is deficient in the enzyme lactase, which breaks down the lactose in the intestine. Bloating, cramps, constipation, or diarrhea may result when an individual who is lactose intolerant consumes a dairy product. 
Due to genetic differences, intolerance of lactose is more common globally than tolerance.
Rates of lactose intolerance vary globally, from less than 10% in Northern Europe to as high as 95% in parts of Asia and Africa. 
In a modern Western context, food products are manufactured as dairy substitutes partly to cater to lactose intolerant individuals, including milk, yogurt, whipped topping and ice cream. In Asia and Africa, where rates of lactose intolerance are much higher than in the West and dairy production has been less predominant, many traditional analogues to dairy milk beverages exist, including amazake, douzhi, kunnu aya, kokkoh, poi and sikhye.

Lactose-free manufacturing
A lactose-free food, such as non-dairy ice cream, may require a different process during manufacturing. For example, traditional dairy ice cream is made with a combination of milk products that contain lactose, but non-dairy ice cream may be synthesized using hydrogenated or partially hydrogenated vegetable oil (coconut oil, palm kernel oil and soybean oil) along with emulsifier, protein, sweetener and water. Some not yet widely prevalent synthetic ice cream products are claimed to have a similar flavour and texture to traditional dairy ice cream.

However many smaller scale, organic, gourmet or slow food focused non-dairy ice cream manufacturers create all their products using traditional, natural and only slightly altered methods. The preferred base for non dairy ice creams are often coconut milk or plant cream, due to the higher fat and lower water content preventing the formation of ice crystals.

Infant formula

Breast milk substitutes are available for infants if breast feeding is not an option. Infant formulas based on cow's milk, soy or rice can be a supplement to breast milk or a sole source of nutrition before solid food is introduced. Infant formula is usually fortified with dietary nutrients optimized for babies and toddlers, such as iron, to ensure survival, growth and health of the baby.

Many parents are turning to plant based milk substitutes due to infant allergies and an increase in vegan diets in recent years, as well as their perceived nutritional benefits. Cow's milk based formulae are still the recommended alternate when breast milk is not possible. Soy-based formula and rice-based formula tend to be the most common plant based alternatives.

In the past, soy-based formulae were correlated with certain nutritional deficiencies in infants, but have since been supplemented with necessary vitamins, minerals, and amino acids. Other questions about nutritional detriments of soy-based formulae have arisen, including potential hormonal effects, but research does not support this outcome. Soy is also a common infant allergen.

Rice is one of the lesser allergenic alternatives, and hydrolyzed hypo-allergenic rice-based formulae has been developed which have also been fortified with necessary nutritional substitutes. However, rice milk formulae are still not recommended for young children as a second choice to cow's milk formula or breast milk due to arsenic levels.

For more information about choosing infant formulas, please consult your pediatrician and the guidelines recommended by associations such as The American Academy of Pediatrics.

Nutrition 
Lactose intolerance and other milk-related intolerances are extremely common, with lactose intolerance affecting around 65 to 75% of the population. For this reason and personal dietary restrictions such as plant-based diets, many people turn to milk substitutes.

In comparison with cow's milk, some plant-based milk substitutes have less calories, but therefore provide less energy. They also tend to be higher in carbohydrates and contain more added sugars to enhance flavor. Soy milk seems to have the closest protein level to cow's milk, with oat and almond milk having less. Cow's milk tends to have higher levels of lipids. However, plant based milks tend to contain more dietary fiber.

In calcium, some nut milks and soy milk have a comparable level of calcium to cow's milk, as many are fortified to contain more calcium.

See also 

Coffee substitute
Egg substitutes
Meat analogue
Plant milk
Salt substitute
Sugar substitute

References

Further reading 

 
 
 

 
Imitation foods
Substitutes
Non-alcoholic drinks
Vegetarianism and drinks